Alfred Gager (10 February 1942 – 10 January 2022) was an Austrian footballer who played as a midfielder for Austria Wien and Wacker Wien. He made six appearances for the Austria national team from 1962 to 1963. Gager died on 10 January 2022, at the age of 79.

References

External links
 

1942 births
2022 deaths
Austrian footballers
Association football midfielders
Austria international footballers
FK Austria Wien players
FC Admira Wacker Mödling players
Footballers from Vienna